State Route 115 (SR 115) is a  state highway in the U.S. state of Washington serving the city of Ocean Shores in Grays Harbor County. The highway begins at Point Brown Avenue in Ocean Shores and travels east across the peninsula before turning north and ending at SR 109 south of Ocean City at Oyehut-Hogan's Corner. SR 115 was established in 1973 to serve Ocean Shores and follows a road built in the 1950s.

Route description

SR 115 begins as Damon Road at an intersection with Point Brown Avenue north of Ocean Shores in Grays Harbor County, located on the shores of the Pacific Ocean. The highway travels east and passes North Beach High School before turning north, following the North Bay of Grays Harbor towards Ocean City State Park. SR 115 continues north into woodlands, passing several unnamed lakes, to Oyehut-Hogan's Corner, where the highway ends at an intersection with SR 109 west of Hogan's Corner Airport.

Every year, the Washington State Department of Transportation (WSDOT) conducts a series of surveys on its highways in the state to measure traffic volume. This is expressed in terms of annual average daily traffic (AADT), which is a measure of traffic volume for any average day of the year. In 2011, WSDOT calculated that between 6,600 and 7,100 vehicles per day used the highway.

History

SR 115 was established in 1973 on a highway that was built and paved in the 1950s to connect Ocean Shores to Secondary State Highway 9C (SSH 9C), later SR 109. The highway was added to the state system on the recommendation of the state legislature's transportation committee, noting that it served as a major recreational route for travelers outside the local area. No major revisions to the route of the highway have occurred since 1973.

Major intersections

References

External links

Highways of Washington State

115
Transportation in Grays Harbor County, Washington